Beaufort Historic District is a national historic district located at Beaufort, Carteret County, North Carolina. It encompasses 16 contributing buildings in the oldest section of the town of Beaufort.  The buildings include notable examples of Queen Anne and Greek Revival, and Gothic Revival style architecture.  Located in the district are the separately listed Gibbs House, Jacob Henry House, and Old Burying Ground.

It was listed on the National Register of Historic Places in 2003.

References

Historic districts on the National Register of Historic Places in North Carolina
Queen Anne architecture in North Carolina
Greek Revival architecture in North Carolina
Gothic Revival architecture in North Carolina
Buildings and structures in Carteret County, North Carolina
National Register of Historic Places in Carteret County, North Carolina